3rd millennium BC in music - 2nd millennium BC in music - 1st millennium BC in music

Events 
 2000 BC - Percussion instruments are added to Egyptian orchestras.
 2000 BC - The trumpet is played in Denmark.
 1500 BC - Harps are played in Egypt.
 1500 BC - Guitar, lyre, trumpet, and tambourine are used by the Hittites.
 1400 BC - the Hurrian song is engraved on a clay tablet.

See also
List of years in music

References

Music